The  Index is a standard index used to measure ionospheric disturbances. It is defined as the ratio of the standard deviation of signal intensity to the average signal intensity.

Real Time data
This parameter is displayed in real time by many institutions:
at Arecibo Observatory
at Cornell University
at INPE, in Brasil

References

Ionosphere